Nephele aequivalens is a moth of the family Sphingidae. It is known from forests up to 5,000 feet and heavy woodland throughout tropical Africa.

References

Nephele (moth)
Moths described in 1856
Moths of Africa